Kylie Live in New York is a live album by Australian singer and songwriter, Kylie Minogue. The album is a live recording of her For You, for Me Tour, during her performance at the Hammerstein Ballroom in New York City. Live in New York was released on 14 December 2009, exclusively to online digital media stores. The album does not include "Better than Today", which was not included due to it appearing on Minogue's then forthcoming album Aphrodite. Minogue's official YouTube page streamed a live recording of the first half of the concert on 12 December 2009.

Release
The album was initially released to digitally to various online stores both in the U.S. and internationally. To promote the album, Minogue streamed the first half of the album on her official YouTube channel. To promote her following album, Aphrodite, a promotional sampler was released in addition with the album at Asda Supermarkets. Additionally, a free promotional sampler, entitled Performance, was included in The Mail on Sunday on 19 September 2010.

Track listing

Personnel
Backing vocals – Roxanne Wilde, Lucita Jules
Bass – Jenni Tarma
Drums (electric and acoustic) – Matthew Racher
Guitar – Adrian Eccleston
Keyboards – Sarah De Courcy
Producer, mixer, programmer – Steve Anderson
Recorded by – Gary Bradshaw
Saxophone – Graeme Belvins
Trombone – Barnaby Dickinson
Trumpet – Graeme Flowers

References

External links
 Kylie.com – official website

Kylie Minogue live albums
2009 live albums
Albums recorded at the Hammerstein Ballroom
Parlophone live albums
Capitol Records live albums
Astralwerks live albums